Zache or Zacha (d. after 1055) was a noble in the Kingdom of Hungary, who served as palatine around 1055, during the reign of Andrew I of Hungary. His name was mentioned in the establishing charter of the abbey of Tihany.

References

Sources
  Markó, László (2006). A magyar állam főméltóságai Szent Istvántól napjainkig – Életrajzi Lexikon ("The High Officers of the Hungarian State from Saint Stephen to the Present Days – A Biographical Encyclopedia") (2nd edition); Helikon Kiadó Kft., Budapest; .
  Zsoldos, Attila (2011). Magyarország világi archontológiája, 1000–1301 ("Secular Archontology of Hungary, 1000–1301"). História, MTA Történettudományi Intézete. Budapest. 

Palatines of Hungary
11th-century Hungarian people